The Journal of Individual Differences is an academic journal covering personality psychology published by Hogrefe Publishing. The editor in chief is Martin Voracek (University of Vienna).

The Journal of Individual Differences publishes research on individual differences in behavior, emotion, cognition, and their developmental aspects. It endeavours to integrate  fields - for instance molecular genetics and theories of complex behavior.

Abstracting and indexing 
The Journal of Individual Differences is abstracted and indexed in Current Contents/Social and Behavioral Sciences, Social Sciences Citation Index, and PsycINFO.

External links
 
{https://www.journals.elsevier.com/personality-and-individual-differences}

{https://www.researchgate.net/journal/1614-0001_Journal_of_Individual_Differences}

English-language journals
Personality journals
Publications established in 1980
Quarterly journals
Hogrefe Publishing academic journals